Leon Katz,  (August 9, 1909 – March 1, 2004) was a Canadian physicist.

Biography
Born in Lutsk 
(then part of the Russian Empire; after World War I part of Poland), Katz emigrated to Canada in 1920 and was reunited with his father who emigrated in 1914.  During these early years he studied at Toronto Central Technical School to become an electrician, however through an exchange program with Queens University he was able to transfer into a science program working part-time to afford tuition.

Katz completed his undergraduate and MSc degrees at Queen’s University, and received a PhD from the California Institute of Technology. He specialized in Accelerator Physics, RF Systems and, in later life, Chaos Theory.   After working for Westinghouse Electric Company on radar equipment for aircraft, in Pittsburgh, in 1946 he moved to Saskatoon to become an associate professor at the University of Saskatchewan.  In collaboration with Drs. Haslam and Jones he was part of the team that was successful in bring a Betatron to the University of Saskatchewan, that was used as the first radiation therapy facility in the province and also for research. He was the founding Director of the Saskatchewan Accelerator Laboratory from 1964-1975 that eventually led to the formation of the Canadian Light Source.

Honours
Katz also served or was honored as:
Fellow of the Royal Society of Canada (1952)
Fellow of the American Physical Society (1966)
Member of Science Council of Canada (1966–72)
President of the Canadian Association of Physicists (1973–74) 
Appointed Officer of the Order of Canada (1974)
Member of the Council of Trustees of the Institute for Research on Public Policy (1974–86)
Director of the Science Secretariat of the Government of Saskatchewan (1975–80)
Honorary Degree University of Saskatchewan (1990)
Prime of Life Achievement Award, University of Saskatchewan Retirees Association
Rotary Golden Wheel Award for Excellence (2000)

References 

 Archives: Leon Katz papers, 1965-1973: Murray Memorial Library. University Archives, University of Saskatchewan, Saskatoon
 Canadian Association of Physicists, Obituary: In Memoriam Leon Katz 1910-2004, Physics in Canada, Vol. 60, No. 2, 2004, p. 70-71

1909 births
2004 deaths
People from Lutsk
20th-century Canadian physicists
Canadian nuclear physicists
Polish emigrants to Canada
Jews from the Russian Empire
Fellows of the Royal Society of Canada
Officers of the Order of Canada
University of Saskatchewan alumni
Queen's University at Kingston alumni
Presidents of the Canadian Association of Physicists
Fellows of the American Physical Society